The Convention on the Continental Shelf was an international treaty created to codify the rules of international law relating to continental shelves. The treaty, after entering into force 10 June 1964, established the rights of a sovereign state over the continental shelf surrounding it, if there be any. The treaty was one of three agreed upon at the first United Nations Convention on the Law of the Sea (UNCLOS I). It has since been superseded by a new agreement reached in 1982 at UNCLOS III.

The treaty dealt with seven topics: the regime governing the superjacent waters and airspace; laying or maintenance of submarine cables or pipelines; the regime governing navigation, fishing, scientific research and the coastal state's competence in these areas; delimitation; tunneling.

Historical background
The Convention on the Continental Shelf replaced the earlier practice of nations having sovereignty over only a very narrow strip of the sea surrounding them, with anything beyond that strip considered International Waters. This policy was used until President of the United States Harry S Truman proclaimed that the resources on the continental shelf contiguous to the United States belonged to the United States through an Executive Order on 28 September 1945. Many other nations quickly adapted similar policies, most stating that their portion of the sea extended either 12 or 200 nautical miles from its coast.

Rights of states
Article 1 of the convention defined the term shelf in terms of exploitability rather than relying upon the geological definition. It defined a shelf "to the seabed and subsoil of the submarine areas adjacent to the coast but outside the area of the territorial sea, to a depth of 200 meters or, beyond that limit, to where the depth of the superjacent waters admits of the exploitation of the natural resources of the said areas" or "to the seabed and subsoil of similar submarine areas adjacent to the coasts of islands".

Besides outlining what is legal in continental shelf areas, it also dictated what could not be done in Article 5.

Participants

UNCLOS II and III
In 1960, the United Nations held another conference regarding the Laws of the Sea, UNCLOS II, but no agreements were reached. However, another conference was called in 1973 to address the issues. UNCLOS III, which lasted until 1982 due to a required consensus, adjusted and redefined many principles stated in the first UNCLOS. The new definition of the Continental shelf in the new Convention rendered the 1958 Convention on the Continental Shelf obsolete. The principal reason for this was technological advancements.

References

External links
Ratifications , at depositary
 Anna Cavnar, Accountability and the Commission on the Limits of the Continental Shelf: Deciding Who Owns the Ocean Floor

1964 in the environment
Law of the sea treaties
United Nations treaties
Treaties concluded in 1958
Treaties entered into force in 1964
Convention
Treaties of the People's Socialist Republic of Albania
Treaties of Australia
Treaties of the Byelorussian Soviet Socialist Republic
Treaties of Bosnia and Herzegovina
Treaties of the People's Republic of Bulgaria
Treaties of the Kingdom of Cambodia (1953–1970)
Treaties of Canada
Treaties of Colombia
Treaties of Costa Rica
Treaties of Croatia
Treaties of Cyprus
Treaties of Czechoslovakia
Treaties of the Czech Republic
Treaties of Denmark
Treaties of the Dominican Republic
Treaties of Fiji
Treaties of Finland
Treaties of France
Treaties of the Kingdom of Greece
Treaties of Guatemala
Treaties of Haiti
Treaties of Israel
Treaties of Jamaica
Treaties of Kenya
Treaties of Latvia
Treaties of Lesotho
Treaties of Madagascar
Treaties of Malawi
Treaties of Malaysia
Treaties of Malta
Treaties of Mauritius
Treaties of Mexico
Treaties of the Netherlands
Treaties of New Zealand
Treaties of Nigeria
Treaties of Norway
Treaties of the Polish People's Republic
Treaties of the Estado Novo (Portugal)
Treaties of the Socialist Republic of Romania
Treaties of the Soviet Union
Treaties of Senegal
Treaties of Sierra Leone
Treaties of Slovakia
Treaties of the Solomon Islands
Treaties of South Africa
Treaties of Francoist Spain
Treaties of Eswatini
Treaties of Sweden
Treaties of Switzerland
Treaties of Thailand
Treaties of Tonga
Treaties of Trinidad and Tobago
Treaties of the Ukrainian Soviet Socialist Republic
Treaties of Uganda
Treaties of the United Kingdom
Treaties of the United States
Treaties of Venezuela
Treaties of Yugoslavia
Treaties of Montenegro
Treaties of Serbia and Montenegro
1958 in Switzerland
Treaties extended to the Netherlands Antilles
Treaties extended to Aruba
Treaties extended to the Faroe Islands
Treaties extended to Greenland